Mikko Rimminen (born 1975) is a Finnish novelist and poet. He won the Finlandia Prize for the novel Nenäpäivä or Red Nose Day.

References

External links 

Finnish male novelists
Finnish male poets
1975 births
Living people
21st-century Finnish novelists
21st-century Finnish poets
21st-century male writers